Torpparinmäki (Finnish), Torparbacken (Swedish) is an area in Helsinki, Finland, and in turn part of the Greater Helsinki area. Torpparinmäki is a residential area, situated north of Kehä I.

References

External links 
 BBC report from Torpparinmäki comprehensive school

Quarters of Helsinki